Peragrarchis emmilta is a moth in the family Carposinidae. It is found in China (Kwangtung).

This species has a winglength of 8mm.

References

Diakonoff, A., 1989. Revision of the Palaearctic Carposinidae with description of a new genus and new species (Lepidoptera: Pyraloidea). Zoölogische Verhandelingen. 251: 1–155
Natural History Museum Lepidoptera generic names catalog

Carposinidae
Moths described in 1989